Leung Chun Wing  (born 20 January 1994) is a Hong Kong professional racing cyclist, who most recently rode for UCI Continental team . He rode at the 2015 UCI Track Cycling World Championships. He also competed in road race events at the 2014 Asian Games and won the bronze medal.

Major results

Road
Source: 

2011
 2nd  Time trial, Asian Junior Road Championships
 2nd Road race, National Junior Road Championships
2012
 Asian Junior Road Championships
1st  Time trial
3rd  Road race
2014
 1st  Time trial, National Under-23 Road Championships
 3rd  Road race, Asian Games
 Asian Under-23 Road Championships
3rd  Time trial
4th Road race
2015
 National Road Championships
1st  Under-23 road race
1st  Under-23 time trial
2nd Road race
2nd Time trial
 1st Stage 4 Tour de Ijen
 4th Road race, Asian Road Championships
2017
 National Road Championships
1st  Road race
1st  Time trial
 Asian Road Championships
3rd  Team time trial
8th Road race
2018
 3rd  Team time trial, Asian Road Championships
2019
 2nd Time trial, National Road Championships
 3rd  Team time trial, Asian Road Championships

Track

2012
 1st  Points race, UCI Juniors Track World Championships
2013
 3rd  Team pursuit, Asian Track Championships
2014
 Asian Track Championships
1st  Madison (with Cheung King Lok)
2nd  Team pursuit
2015
 1st  Madison, Asian Track Championships (with Cheung King Lok)
2016
 2nd  Madison, Asian Track Championships (with Cheung King Lok)
2017
 Asian Indoor and Martial Arts Games
1st  Omnium
2nd  Team pursuit
 Asian Track Championships
1st  Scratch
2nd  Omnium
2018
 1st  Madison, 2017–18 UCI Track Cycling World Cup, Minsk (with Cheung King Lok)
 Asian Games
1st  Madison (with Cheung King Lok)
2nd  Omnium
2nd  Team pursuit
 1st  Madison, Asian Track Championships (with Cheung King Lok)
2019
 3rd  Team pursuit, 2020 Asian Track Cycling Championships

References

External links
 

1994 births
Living people
Hong Kong male cyclists
Place of birth missing (living people)
Asian Games medalists in cycling
Cyclists at the 2014 Asian Games
Cyclists at the 2018 Asian Games
Medalists at the 2014 Asian Games
Medalists at the 2018 Asian Games
Asian Games gold medalists for Hong Kong
Asian Games silver medalists for Hong Kong
Asian Games bronze medalists for Hong Kong
Cyclists at the 2016 Summer Olympics
Olympic cyclists of Hong Kong
21st-century Hong Kong people